Lewis Shay Jankel (born 27 May 1993), better known by his stage name Shift K3Y (pronounced "shift key"), is a British DJ, record producer, singer and songwriter, from London. He is best known for his 2014 singles "Touch", which peaked at number 3 on the UK Singles Chart, and "I Know".

Career

2011–2012: Early career and record deals
Jankel released his debut EP Step in the City on 12 December 2011, through Marco Del Horno's record label Bullet Train. "Manage Ya", one of the EP tracks, was supported by BBC Radio 1 and 1Xtra DJs including MistaJam and Toddla T. On 23 July 2012, he released his second EP Left and Right with the label. Throughout the year, he released many remixes and bootlegs. Towards the end of 2012, he gained the attention of Borgore's record label Buygore and his song "Wiggle With It" featured exclusively on the label's Buygore Allstars Vol. 1 compilation. He released his third EP Let You Down through Buygore, and the track "Geeky Playtime" gained exposure through being uploaded to UKF.

2013–present: Breakthrough
In 2013, Jankel changed his stage name from Shift Key to Shift K3Y. In March 2013, he released his fourth EP Frozen, through Buygore. He remixed Tinie Tempah's song "Trampoline", which was premiered by SB.TV (as the first of their SB.TV Beats features) and topped the Beatport hip hop charts. He also remixed AlunaGeorge's "Attracting Flies", and the remix was heavily supported by 1Xtra. Throughout 2013, he released three free singles: "Keep Ya Mouth Shut (Things People Say)" featuring Griminal; "Make It Good"; and "Laughing At You" which features vocals by Ruby Francis. On 13 April 2014, he released his breakthrough single "Touch". On 16 April 2014, the song was at number 3 on The Official Chart Update in the UK. On 20 April 2014, the song managed to maintain its position and entered the UK Singles Chart at number 3, making it his first UK top 5 single. The follow-up single, "I Know", was released on 21 September 2014. It reached number 25 on the UK Singles Chart. A non-single, titled "Not Into It (LA Mix)", samples vocals from "Long Way 2 Go" by Cassie and premiered on Annie Mac's Radio 1 show on 10 October 2014. Jankel's third mainstream single, "Name & Number", was released on 3 May 2015.

Personal life
Shift K3Y is the son of Chaz Jankel, a British singer, songwriter, composer and record producer and his wife Elaine O'Halloran.

Discography

Studio albums

Extended plays

Singles

As lead artist

As featured artist

Promotional singles

Songwriting and production credits

Remixes

References

External links
 
 
 

Living people
1993 births
English electronic musicians
DJs from London
English record producers
UK garage musicians
English songwriters
English people of Irish descent
English people of Jewish descent
Electronic dance music DJs
Remixers